Tsukamurella inchonensis is a bacterium with type strain IMMIB D-771T (= DSM 44067T).

References

Further reading
Dworkin, Martin, and Stanley Falkow, eds. The Prokaryotes: Vol. 3:  Archaea. Bacteria: Firmicutes, Actinomycetes. Vol. 3. Springer, 2006.
Sneath, Peter HA, et al. Bergey's manual of systematic bacteriology. Volume 5. Williams & Wilkins, 1986.

Takebe, Isao, et al. "Catheter-related Bloodstream Infection by Tsukamurella inchonensis in an Immunocompromised Patient." Journal of Clinical Microbiology (2014): JCM-00421.

External links 

LPSN
Type strain of Tsukamurella inchonensis at BacDive -  the Bacterial Diversity Metadatabase

Mycobacteriales
Bacteria described in 1985